The Adi people are one of the most populous groups of indigenous peoples in the Indian state of Arunachal Pradesh. A few thousand are also found in the Tibet Autonomous Region, where they are called the Lhoba together with some of the Nishi people, Na people, Mishmi people and Tagin people.

They live in a region of the Southern Himalayas which falls within the Indian state of Arunachal Pradesh and the Mainling, Lhunze, Zayu, Medog, and Nyingchi counties in the Tibet Autonomous Region, China. The present habitat of the Adi people is heavily influenced by the historic location of the ancient Lhoyu. They are found in the temperate and sub-tropical regions within the districts of Siang, East Siang, Upper Siang, West Siang, Lower Dibang Valley, Lohit, Shi Yomi and Namsai within Arunachal Pradesh. The term "Adi" however, is not to be confused with the Lhoba people, since the Lhoba also includes the Mishmi along with the Adi people. All the ethnic groups recognizing themselves as "Adi" are believed to be descendants of the Abutani/Abotani. The older term Abor is an exonym from Assamese and its literal meaning is "independent". The literal meaning of adi is "hill" or "mountain top".

Organisation of the community 
The Adi live in hill villages, each traditionally keeping to itself, under a selected chief styled Gam or Gao Burra who moderates the village council, which acts even as the traditional court, referred to as a Kebang. The olden day councils consisted of all the village elders and decisions were decided in a Musup/Dere (village community house) on a majority they live in houses with stilts.

Language 

The various languages and dialects of the Adi people fall into two groups: Abor (Abor-Minyong, Bor-abor (Padam), Abor-Miri, etc.) and Lhoba (Lho-Pa, Luoba).

Adi literature has been developed by Christian missionaries since 1900. The missionaries J. H. Lorrain and F. W. Savidge published an Abor-Miri Dictionary in 1906 with the help of Mupak Mili and Atsong Pertin, considered the fathers of the Adi language or Adi script.

Adi is taught as a third language in schools of communities dominated by the Adi.

The Adi speak Hindi as a lingua-franca for communicating with other indigenous groups of people in Arunachal Pradesh and the other northeast states.

Culture 

Dormitories play an important role among the Adi people, and certain rules governing the dormitories are observed. For example, a male can visit the dormitory of a female, although he is not allowed to stay overnight. At times, guardians will have to be around to guide the youngsters.

There are separate dresses for women and men which are woven by women of the tribes. Helmets made from cane, bear, and deerskin are sometimes worn by the men, depending on the region.

Tattooing was popular among the older women.

The traditional measure of a family's wealth is the possession of domestic animals (particularly gayals), beads and ornaments, and land.

Festivals and dances 
The Adi celebrate a number of festivals, in particular, their prime festivals are Aran, Donggin, Solung, Podi Barbii and Etor. Solung is observed in the first week of September for five days or more. It is a harvest festival performed after the sowing of seeds and transplantation, to seek for future bumper crops. Ponung songs and dances are performed by women folk during the festival. On the last day of Solung, throne and indigenous weaponry are displayed along the passage of the houses – a belief that they would protect people from evil spirits (This ritual is called Taktor).

Adi dances vary from the slow, rustic and beautifully enchanting Ponung style (performed in Solung festival) to the exhilarating, exuberant thumps of Delong performed by men during the Etor festival. These dances have led to certain forms of dancing which jointly narrate a story, the Tapu (War Dance). In the Tapu, the dancers vigorously re-enact the actions of war, its gory details and the triumphant cries of the warriors. Yakjong is performed in the Aran festival. This is another kind of dance whereby the dancers carry sticks with designs created by removing the barks in certain patterns and then put into the fire for some time, which creates the marked black designs.

Lifestyle 

The Adi practice wet rice cultivation and have a considerable agricultural economy. Rice serves as the staple food for them along with meat and other vegetables

Religion 
The majority of Adi traditionally follow the tribal Donyi-Polo religion. Worship of gods and goddesses like Kine Nane, Doying Bote, Gumin Soyin and Pedong Nane, etc., and religious observances are led by a shaman, called Miri (can be a female). Each deity is associated with certain tasks and acts as a protector and guardian of various topics related to nature which revolves around their daily life. This includes the food crops, home, rain, etc.

Adi in Tibet, in particular the Bokars, have adopted Tibetan Buddhism to a certain extent, as a result of Tibetan influence. However, in recent years a revival in indigenous identity on the part of the Tibetan Adi people has made traditional religion popular with the youth again. In modern times, a few Adi people have converted to Christianity. But been increasing and call of local leaders to stop converting and demographics shift.

Notes

References 
 Danggen, Bani. (2003). The kebang: A unique indigenous political institution of the Adis. Delhi: Himalayan Publishers. 
 Hamilton, A. (1983 [1912]). In Abor jungles of north-east India. Delhi: Mittal Publications.
 Dr.Milorai Modi (2007). The Milangs. Delhi: Himalayan Publications.
 Mibang, Tamo; & Chaudhuri, S. K. (Eds.) (2004). Understanding tribal religion. New Delhi: Mittal. .
 Mibang, Tamo; & Chaudhuri, S. K. (Eds.) (2004). Folk culture and oral literature from north-east India. New Delhi: Mittal. .
 Lego, N. N. (1992). British relations with the Adis, 1825-1947. New Delhi: Omsons Publications. .
 BBC TV program Tribe, episode on the Adi; explorer Bruce Parry lived among them for a month as an honorary tribesman, 'adopted' by a village gam.
 Nyori, Tai (1993). History and Culture of the Adis, Omsons Publications, New Delhi-110 027.
 Danggen, Bani. (2003). A book of conversation: A help book for English to Adi conversation. Itanagar: Himalayan Publishers. .
 Mibang, Tamo; & Abraham, P. T. (2001). An introduction to Adi language. Itanagar, Arunachal Pradeh: Himalayan Publishers. .

Further reading
 Lalrempuii, C. (2011). "Morphology of the Adi language of Arunachal Pradesh" (Doctoral dissertation).
 Nyori, T. (1988). Origin of the name 'Abor'/'Adi'. In Proceedings of North East India History Association (Vol. 9, p. 95). The Association.

External links 

 BBC: Adi Tribe
 Research Centre for Linguistic Typology: Mark Post (fieldworker)
Adi Audio Sample at the Endangered Languages Project

Scheduled Tribes of Arunachal Pradesh
Tribes of Arunachal Pradesh